Unidentified may refer to:

 Unidentified (2006 film), American film
 Unidentified (2020 film), Romanian film